Lungani is a commune in Iași County, Western Moldavia, Romania. It is composed of four villages: Crucea, Goești, Lungani and Zmeu.

References

Communes in Iași County
Localities in Western Moldavia